Nacional Transportes Aéreos was a Brazilian airline founded in 2000. It ceased operations in 2002.

History
The low-fare carrier Nacional Transportes Aéreos was founded on December 26, 2000 and had as its first service the trunk route São Paulo-Guarulhos / Rio de Janeiro-Galeão / Recife / Fortaleza / São Luís, operated with a Boeing 737-400. The following year, Araçatuba, Brasília, Campo Grande, Cuiabá and Goiânia were added to the network. The Boeing 737-400 was returned to the leasor in April 2001 and replaced by a Boeing 737-200. A second 737-200 arrived in July 2001.

In January 2002, as a consequence of a financial crisis, Nacional was forced to return the aircraft and ceased all operations a few weeks later.

Destinations
Araçatuba – Dario Guarita Airport
Brasília – Pres. Juscelino Kubitschek International Airport
Campo Grande – Campo Grande International Airport
Cuiabá – Marechal Rondon International Airport
Fortaleza – Pinto Martins International Airport 
Goiânia – Santa Genoveva Airport
Recife – Guararapes/Gilberto Freyre International Airport
Rio de Janeiro – Galeão/Antonio Carlos Jobim International Airport
São Luís – Marechal Cunha Machado International Airport 
São Paulo – Guarulhos/Gov. André Franco Montoro International Airport

Fleet

Airline Affinity Program
Nacional did not have an airline affinity program.

See also
List of defunct airlines of Brazil

References

External links
Nacional Photo Archive at airliners.net

Defunct airlines of Brazil
Airlines established in 2000
Airlines disestablished in 2002